is a Japanese football player. He plays for SC Sagamihara.

Career
Takuya Iwata joined the J2 League club Thespakusatsu Gunma in 2017. In July, he moved to the J3 League club SC Sagamihara.

Club statistics
Updated to 22 August 2018.

References

External links

Profile at Thespakusatsu Gunma
Profile at J. League

1994 births
Living people
Meiji University alumni
Association football people from Tokyo Metropolis
People from Kodaira, Tokyo
Japanese footballers
J2 League players
J3 League players
Thespakusatsu Gunma players
SC Sagamihara players
Association football forwards